Kerry-Lee Harrington (born 21 March 1986) is a South African badminton player. She won a bronze medal, along with her partner Stacy Doubell, in the women's doubles at the 2007 All-Africa Games in Algiers, Algeria.
Harrington represented South Africa at the 2008 Summer Olympics in Beijing, where she competed in the women's singles. She received a bye for the second preliminary round match, before losing out to Malaysia's Wong Mew Choo, with a score of 4–21 each in two straight periods.

Achievements

All-Africa Games 
Women's doubles

African Championships 
Women's singles

Women's doubles

BWF International Challenge/Series (4 runners-up) 
Women's singles

Women's doubles

  BWF International Challenge tournament
  BWF International Series tournament
  BWF Future Series tournament

References

External links 
 
 
 
 
 
 NBC 2008 Olympics profile

1986 births
Living people
Sportspeople from Durban
South African female badminton players
Badminton players at the 2008 Summer Olympics
Olympic badminton players of South Africa
Badminton players at the 2006 Commonwealth Games
Commonwealth Games competitors for South Africa
Competitors at the 2007 All-Africa Games
Competitors at the 2011 All-Africa Games
African Games silver medalists for South Africa
African Games bronze medalists for South Africa
African Games medalists in badminton
20th-century South African women
21st-century South African women